James Acton (11 October 1848 – 22 August 1924) was an English first-class cricketer.  Acton's batting and bowling styles are unknown.

Early life 
He was born at Southampton, Hampshire on 11 October 1848.

Career 
Acton made two first-class appearances for Hampshire, against the Marylebone Cricket Club in 1880 and Somerset in 1882.

Against the Marylebone Cricket Club, Acton was dismissed for 31 in Hampshire's first-innings by John West, with Hampshire winning the match by an innings.

Against Somerset, he scored two runs in Hampshire's first-innings, before being dismissed by Bill Fowler.  In their second-innings he was dismissed for eight runs by Robert Ramsay, with Somerset losing by five wickets.

Death 
Acton died at Reading, Berkshire on 22 August 1924.

References

External links 
James Acton at ESPNcricinfo
James Acton at CricketArchive

1848 births
1924 deaths
Cricketers from Southampton
English cricketers
Hampshire cricketers